Fame  was built in 1815 at Quebec. She transferred her registry to Great Britain in 1819. She traded widely and was last listed in 1833.

Career
Fame first appeared in Lloyd's Register (LR) in 1816.

Fame was re-registered at Greenock in 1819.

Citations

References
 
 

1815 ships
Ships built in Quebec
Age of Sail merchant ships of England